Serhiy Zahidulin (born 26 March 1992 in Zhytomyr, in Ukraine) is a professional Ukrainian football defender.

Career
He played for club FC Karpaty Lviv in Ukrainian Premier League.

Zahidulin is the product of the FC Polissya Zhytomyr and UFK Lviv School Systems. He made his debut for FC Karpaty entering as a second-half substitute against FC Dnipro Dnipropetrovsk on 28 October 2012 in Ukrainian Premier League.

References

External links
Statistics at FFU website (Ukr)

1992 births
Living people
Ukrainian footballers
FC Karpaty Lviv players
FC Karpaty-2 Lviv players
Ukrainian Premier League players
FC Bukovyna Chernivtsi players
NK Veres Rivne players
Association football forwards
Footballers from Zhytomyr